The following lists events that happened during 1906 in South Africa.

Incumbents
 Governor of the Cape of Good Hope and High Commissioner for Southern Africa:Walter Hely-Hutchinson.
 Governor of the Colony of Natal: Henry Edward McCallum.
 Prime Minister of the Cape of Good Hope: Leander Starr Jameson.
 Prime Minister of the Orange River Colony: William Palmer, 2nd Earl of Selborne.
 Prime Minister of the Colony of Natal:  Charles John Smythe (until 28 November), Frederick Robert Moor (starting 28 November).

Events
February
 11 – Two British £1-per-head tax collectors are killed near Richmond, sparking the Bambatha Rebellion led by Chief Bambatha kaMancinza, leader of the  clan of the Zulu people.

May
 2 – Lord Alfred Milner, British colonial secretary and the High Commissioner for Southern Africa, returns to Britain.
 6 – British troops kill over 60 Zulu warriors during a punitive expedition near Durban.

June
 The first issue of the Annals of the Natal Government Museum (currently African Invertebrates) is published by Natal Museum in Pietermaritzburg, South Africa.

Unknown date
 Tuberculosis reaches epidemic proportions in South Africa.

Births
 6 January – Walter Battiss, artist, is born in Somerset East (d. 1982)
 5 March – Siegfried Mynhardt, actor, is born in Johannesburg. (d. 1996)
 11 June – N.P. van Wyk Louw, poet, dramatist and essayist, is born in Sutherland, Cape Colony. (d. 1970)
 30 October – Archibald Campbell Mzoliza Jordan, Xhosa writer and linguist, is born near Tsolo in the Cape Colony.
 13 December – Laurens van der Post, author, farmer, war hero, political adviser, educator, journalist, humanitarian, philosopher, explorer and conservationist, is born in Philippolis. (d. 1996)

Deaths

Railways

Railway lines opened
 Transvaal – Nancefield to Pimville, .
 22 January – Cape Central – Riversdale to Voorbaai, .
 6 February – Free State – Jagersfontein to Fauresmith, .
 1 April – Cape Midland – Port Elizabeth to Humewood Road (Narrow gauge), .
 6 April – Transvaal – Orkney to Fourteen Streams, .
 16 May – Natal – Donnybrook to Creighton, .
 1 June – Natal – Ennersdale to Loskop, .
 21 June – Free State – Bethlehem to Kroonstad, .
 21 June – Transvaal – Pienaarsrivier to Settlers (Regauged), .

 1 August – Cape Western – Pampoenpoort to Carnarvon, .
 29 August – Cape Eastern – Elliot to Maclear, .
 1 December – Cape Midland – Humansdorp to Misgund (Narrow gauge), .
 15 December – Cape Midland – Valley Junction to Walmer (Narrow gauge), .
 17 December – Cape Eastern – Eagle to Butterworth, .
 26 December – Transvaal – Apex to Witbank, .
 27 December – Transvaal – Pretoria North to Rustenburg, .

Locomotives
Cape
 The Cape Government Railways places three locomotives in service, two of them experimental.
 An experimental 9th Class  Mikado steam locomotive. In 1912 it will be designated Class Experimental 5 on the South African Railways (SAR).
 An experimental 10th Class  Mastodon locomotive for the Cape Eastern System. In 1912 it will be designated Class Experimental 6 on the SAR.
 A single self-contained Railmotor for low-volume passenger service on the Franschhoek branchline.

Natal
 The Natal Government Railways (NGR) modifies six of its  Class B locomotives to a  wheel arrangement, the first  Mountain type tender locomotive in the world. In 1912 it will be designated Class 1B on the South African Railways (SAR).
 In April the NGR places two Class N 4-6-2 narrow gauge tank locomotives in service on the new narrow gauge line that is being built between Estcourt and Weenen.

References

 
South Africa
Years in South Africa